George Evans, 1st Baron Carbery PC (Ire) (c. 1680 – 28 August 1749) was an Anglo-Irish politician and peer. A member of a County Limerick family of Whigs, he entered the Irish House of Commons and was created a peer in 1715 as a reward for his father's support of the Hanoverian succession, after his father declined the offer. At the same time, he was returned to the British House of Commons for Westbury. He contested control of the borough with the Tories led by the Earl of Abingdon until 1727, when he stood down.

Evans was the son of George Evens, of Bulgaden Hall, County Limerick and his wife (m. 1679) Mary (née Eyre). Lord Carbery married Anne, daughter of William Stafford, in 1703. She later inherited Laxton Hall from her brother. They had five children:
Stafford Evans (b. 1704), died young
George Evans, 2nd Baron Carbery (d. 1759)
Hon. William Evans (d. bef. 1756)
Hon. John Evans (d. 1758), of Bulgaden Hall, High Sheriff of County Limerick in 1734, married Grace Freke, sister and heiress of Sir Redmond Freke, 3rd Baronet, in June 1741 and had issue, including Sir John Evans-Freke, 1st Baronet
Hon. Anne Evans, married Maj. Charles du Terme in 1734

After the death of Charles Oliver, one of the members for County Limerick in the Irish House of Commons, Evans was elected to succeed him in 1707. He sat as a Whig for the county until 1714. On 12 November 1714, he was appointed governor and constable of Limerick Castle. Evans's father had earlier been a strong supporter of William and Mary but declined King George I's offer of a peerage. However, the peerage was accepted by his son, who on 15 March 1714/15 was raised to the Peerage of Ireland as Baron Carbery, of Carbery in the County of Cork, with remainder to the male issue of his father.

With the sponsorship of Lord Cowper and other Whigs, Evans and Charles Allanson stood at Westbury at the 1715 election to challenge the Tory interest of Lord Abingdon. 

The election was held on 25 January 1714/15, and a double return was made: the Tory candidates, Lord Abingdon's nephew Willoughby Bertie and Francis Annesley were returned by the mayor of Abingdon, while the constable returned Evans and Allanson. As the former pair had polled 29 and 28 votes, respectively, to the 19 and 18 of Evans and Allanson, the House of Commons declared the Tories elected on 28 March 1714/1715.

Lord Carbery, as Evans now was, and Allanson lodged an election petition with the House, arguing that many of the Tory voters were not entitled to the franchise, and there were allegations of bribery on both sides. The committee ultimately declared that Bertie and Annesley had not been duly elected and that Carbery and Allanson had been; the Whig-dominated House concurred with the findings of the committee, and resolved that the more narrow interpretation of the Westbury franchise was the correct one. On 18 November 1715, Carbery was admitted to the Irish Privy Council.

Carbery voted in favour of Whig projects such as the Septennial Act 1716 and the unsuccessful Peerage Bill in December 1719, but was not present for the vote on the Religious Worship Act 1718 in January 1718/19, which repealed the Occasional Conformity Act 1711 and Schism Act 1714. 

In the 1722 election, Carbery and Thomas Bennett stood against James Bertie (brother of Lord Abingdon) and Annesley; the Tory candidates were returned by the mayor. Carbery and Bennett again petitioned against the result, alleging undue practices and that they had received a majority of the votes. Although the results of the election were in their favour, they were unable to produce the original copy of the poll, and their petition was dismissed on 25 February 1723/4. Bertie had also been returned for Middlesex and chose to sit for that constituency; in the ensuing by-election at Westbury in 1724, Carbery defeated Edward Conway and returned to Parliament. He did not stand at the 1727 election.

Carbery's appointment as governor and constable of Limerick Castle was renewed in 1740. He died on 28 August 1749 and was succeeded by his son George. Lady Carbery died in 1757.

Notes

References
Kidd, Charles, Williamson, David (editors). Debrett's Peerage and Baronetage (1990 edition). New York: St Martin's Press, 1990, 

1680s births
1749 deaths
18th-century Anglo-Irish people
Barons Carbery
Peers of Ireland created by George I
British MPs 1715–1722
British MPs 1722–1727
Evans, George
Evans, George
Members of the Parliament of Great Britain for English constituencies
Members of the Parliament of Ireland (pre-1801) for County Limerick constituencies
Members of the Privy Council of Ireland
Year of birth uncertain
Members of the Irish House of Lords